José Javier Rodríguez (born August 8, 1978) is an American politician and attorney from Florida. A Democrat, he served one term in the Florida Senate from 2016 to 2020, representing Coral Gables, Palmetto Bay, Pinecrest, Key Biscayne, and downtown Miami in Miami-Dade County. He previously served two terms in the Florida House of Representatives, representing the 112th district in Miami-Dade County from 2012 until his election to the Senate.

He is the nominee to serve as the Assistant Secretary for Employment & Training at the United States Department of Labor in the Biden administration.

Early life and education
Rodríguez grew up in Miami, where he was an Eagle Scout. He attended Brown University, receiving a degree in international relations in 2000.

Career

Florida House of Representatives
In 2012, following the reconfiguration of the state's legislative districts Rodríguez opted to run in the newly created 112th District. He faced Alex Dominguez in the Democratic primary, which the Miami Herald called a "low-key" race compared to the acidic Republican primary. Rodríguez was able to defeat Dominguez by a fairly wide margin, winning the primary with 58% of the vote and advancing to the general election, where he faced former State Senator Alex Díaz de la Portilla. Against Díaz de la Portilla, Rodríguez campaigned on supporting public education, encouraging economic growth, and the fresh perspective that he would bring to the legislature, noting, "My opponent practically invented the business model of pandering to voters in Miami and then selling us out in Tallahassee." Ultimately, Rodríguez defeated Díaz de la Portilla by a relatively slim margin, receiving 54% of the vote to his opponent's 46%.

Florida Senate 
In 2016, court-ordered redistricting created a new 37th district which included all of Rodríguez's house district. Rodríguez decided to run for the new seat against incumbent state senator Miguel Díaz de la Portilla, the brother of Alex. Rodríguez defeated Díaz de la Portilla in the general election, 49 to 46%.

In 2020, Rodríguez lost his re-election bid to Republican Ileana Garcia by a narrow margin of 34 votes. The ballot also included an independent candidate with the same surname, Alex Rodríguez, who was previously registered as Republican. He received more than 6,000 votes and his campaign was funded with dark money linked to Republican strategists. Former state senator Frank Artiles, a Republican, took credit for engineering Alex Rodríguez's run and Garcia's subsequent victory, according to a report by The Miami Herald. Artiles was arrested after it became apparent that he paid $44,708.03 to the sham candidate.

Biden administration
On July 2, 2021, President Joe Biden nominated Rodriguez to serve as the Assistant Secretary for Employment & Training in the Department of Labor. Hearings were held on the nomination in the Senate HELP Committee on October 7, 2021. The committee deadlocked on the nomination on October 26, 2021. Rodriguez's initial nomination expired at the end of the year and was returned to President Biden on January 3, 2022.

President Biden resent his nomination to the Senate the following day. On January 13, 2022, the committee reported his nomination favorably to the Senate floor. His nomination is currently pending before the entire Senate.

Personal life 
Rodríguez married Sonia Succar Ferré, the granddaughter of former Miami mayor Maurice Ferré, in 2014.

References

External links
Florida House of Representatives - José Javier Rodríguez

|-

1978 births
Hispanic and Latino American state legislators in Florida
Living people
Politicians from Miami
Brown University alumni
Harvard Law School alumni
Florida lawyers
Democratic Party members of the Florida House of Representatives
21st-century American politicians
American politicians of Cuban descent